Joseph Edward Hodnett (18 July 1896 – 8 December 1943) was an English professional footballer who played as a half back in the Football League for Brentford, Chesterfield, Gillingham, Merthyr Town and Wolverhampton Wanderers.

Career statistics

References

External links 

 

1896 births
1943 deaths
People from Bilston
English footballers
Willenhall F.C. players
Wolverhampton Wanderers F.C. players
Pontypridd F.C. players
Chesterfield F.C. players
Merthyr Town F.C. players
Brentford F.C. players
Gillingham F.C. players
Stafford Rangers F.C. players
Stourbridge F.C. players
Halesowen Town F.C. players
Dudley Town F.C. players
Brierley Hill Alliance F.C. players
English Football League players
Association football midfielders
FA Cup Final players